Hippolyte Camille LAMY (1875–1942), was an important French archetier (musical bow maker) of the early twentieth century also known as Lamy Fils.

Hippolyte-Camille LAMY was the first son of Joseph Alfred Lamy known as Lamy père. 
From 1890, he started his apprenticeship with his father. Between 1905-1910, gradually personalized his model by widening the throat of the frogs and by slightly enlarging the style of the head.
He continued to work with his father until his death in 1919. He then  took over the workshop and carried on the family tradition.
His style is very close to his father's but as Mr. Raffin says "but slightly more generous".
He died on 14 January 1942 at his home in Paris.
"Hippolyte Camille LAMY's bows are much sought after today by professional musicians world wide." Filimonov Fine Violins

Branded his bows « A. LAMY A PARIS »

References 

 
 
 
 
 

1875 births
1942 deaths
Bow makers
Luthiers from Mirecourt